This is a list of towns and villages in Kiribati. There are no cities in the country.

Abaokoro
Abarao
Aiaki
Ambo
Antai
Bairiki
Banana
Betio
Bikenibeu
Bonriki
Buariki (Aranuka)
Buariki (Tabiteuea)
Buariki (Tarawa)
Bubutei
Buota
Eita
London 
Makin
Marenanuka
Poland
Paris
Rawannawi
Roreti
Rungata
Tabiauea
Taboiaki
Taborio (North Tarawa)
Tabukiniberu
Taburao
Tabwakea
Taubukinmeang
Teaoraereke
Tebikerei
Temaraia
Temwaiku
Tetabakea
Tuarabu
Utiroa
Ukiangang

Ghost Towns 
Paris

 
Kiribati, List of cities in
Cities and villages